Botanophila fugax is a species of fly in the family Anthomyiidae. It is found in the  Palearctic. The larva is a stem borer.

Fungal species Strongwellsea crypta (from genus Strongwellsea, order Entomophthorales) is known to infect Botanophila fugax. It creates abdominal holes in the infected hosts which then develop rapidly and become strikingly large and almost rhomboid in shape.

References

External links
Ecology of Commanster 

Anthomyiidae
Insects described in 1826